The 1964 Michigan gubernatorial election was held on November 3, 1964. Incumbent Republican George W. Romney defeated Democratic nominee Neil O. Staebler with 55.87% of the vote.

General election

Candidates
Major party candidates
George W. Romney, Republican
Neil O. Staebler, Democratic

Major party running mates
William Milliken, Republican
Robert A. Derengoski, Democratic

Other candidates
Frank Lovell, Socialist Workers
Albert B. Cleage Jr., Freedom Now
James C. Horvath, Socialist Labor

Other running mates
Harriet Talan, Socialist Workers
James Jackson, Freedom Now
W. Clifford Bentley, Socialist Labor

Results

Primaries 
The primary elections occurred on September 1, 1964.

Democratic primary

Republican primary

References

1964
Michigan
Gubernatorial
November 1964 events in the United States
George W. Romney